Gabrielle Lester (also known as Gaby Lester) is an English classical violinist and orchestra leader. She maintains an extensive discography of classical, popular and soundtrack recordings.

Career 
Gaby Lester was born in London, and is recognized for chamber music and as a leader of orchestras in the UK. Lester played principal second violin with the Scottish Chamber Orchestra and The Chamber Orchestra of Europe. She played principal second violin for five years with Sir Simon Rattle and the City of Birmingham Symphony Orchestra with whom she also played solo at the BBC Proms. Lester was the Associate Leader of the Royal Philharmonic Orchestra for five years. She led the Orchestra of the Age of Enlightenment in Das Rheingold at the Proms and has guest-led orchestras including the London Philharmonic Orchestra and the BBC Symphony Orchestra.

Lester is a member of the Barbican Piano trio and coaches at the Royal College of Music.  She has directed the Ambache Chamber Ensemble with whom she has recorded chamber music for Chandos Records and has recorded albums with the Michael Nyman Band. She plays regularly at the International Musicians Seminar at Prussia Cove.  Her violin is a Francesco Ruggieri dating from 1670.

Discography 
A partial listing of Lester's recordings includes:
La Sept, Suite 1989
Pete Townshend Live: Sadler's Wells 2000
The Draughtsman's Contract 2005
To Love Again 2005
Doctor Who – Original Television Soundtrack 2006
Overloaded – The Singles Collection 2006
Dark Passion Play 2007
Doctor Who – Original Television Soundtrack 2007
Music From The Motion Picture – The Assassination of Jesse James by the Coward Robert Ford 2007
8 Lust Songs: I Sonetti Lussuriosi 2008
Torchwood (Original Television Soundtrack) 2008
La Pasión 2009

References

External links 
Lester photo from Ambache
Lester plays with Pete Townshend at Sadler's Wells

Living people
Musicians from London
English classical violinists
Year of birth missing (living people)
English classical musicians
British classical violinists
21st-century classical violinists
Women classical violinists